The ochre-faced tody-flycatcher (Poecilotriccus plumbeiceps) is a species of bird in the family Tyrannidae.

It is found in Argentina, Bolivia, Brazil, Paraguay, Peru, and Uruguay. In Uruguay, it was found for the first time in 1997 in the gallery forests of the Yaguarón River, in Cerro Largo Department.

Its natural habitats are subtropical or tropical moist lowland forest, subtropical or tropical moist montane forest, and heavily degraded former forest.

References

ochre-faced tody-flycatcher
Birds of the Yungas
Birds of the Atlantic Forest
ochre-faced tody-flycatcher
Taxonomy articles created by Polbot